Martin Defense Group, formerly Navatek is a military contractor based in Hawaii, founded by Steven Loui in 1979. It was later sold to Martin Kao.

Company history
Navatek was founded by Steven Loui in 1979.
Martin Kao joined Navatek as CFO in the late 2000's, and in 2012 took over the company.

Navatek changed its name to Martin Defense Group in September 2020. An indictment against Kao was unsealed on 30 September 2020. Kao was charged with bank fraud and money laundering related to the CARES Act. In November 2020, Kao stepped down, with Daniel J. Brunk taking over.

Hydrofoil catamarans
They purchased an 85-foothydrofoil catamaran named the Skye and known as Navatek II. By 2019 it was sitting, derelict and gathering fees, in the Ala Wai Harbor. and failed to sell at auction. It began to sink, then was removed by crane.

The company donated a similar 45 foot vessel to Hawaii Pacific University in 2016.

Lobbying
Kao and Navatek made notable political donations from 2013 to 2020, prompting an investigation into their donations to Rep. Susan Collins. On February 10, 2022, three former executives, including Kao, were indicted for improper campaign contributions.

See also
 DARPA Captive Air Amphibious Transporter

References

External links
 Navatek Foilcat seen on Virtual Globetrotting
 "Navatek CEO Warned Workers Of ‘Draconian Consequences’ If They Slacked Off During Pandemic"
 Feds investigating alleged illegal donations to Collins’ re-election bid
 Collins helps contractor before pro-Susan PAC gets donation

Companies based in Hawaii